The Worst Witch is a fantasy drama children's television series. Based on novel series of the same name published in 1974 by Jill Murphy, the series follows Mildred Hubble (Bella Ramsey (series 13), Lydia Page (series 4)) and her friends Maud Spellbody (Meibh Campbell (series 1), Megan Hughes (series 24) and Enid Nightshade (Tamara Smart) and rivals Ethel Hallow (Jenny Richardson), Drusilla Paddock (Tallulah Milligan) and Felicity Foxglove's (Dagny Rollins) adventures and education at Cackle's Academy under caring headmistress Miss Cackle (Clare Higgins) and strict deputy headmistress Miss Hardbroom (Raquel Cassidy). It is the fifth adaptation of The Worst Witch series after the 1986 television film, the 1998 television series, the 2001 television spin-off and the 2005 television spin-off.

The series was an international co-production between CBBC, ZDF and Netflix. The series was made available to stream internationally on Netflix on 22 July 2017. It was available to members in the UK, Ireland and Germany after its premiere on CBBC and ZDF. The series premiered on CBBC on 11 January 2017. A second series began airing from 8 January 2018. The second series premiered on Netflix Australia on 27 July 2018. The third series began airing on 7 January 2019. The fourth series began airing on 27 January 2020. Netflix released the fourth series on 1 October 2020.

Synopsis

Series 1
Mildred Hubble learns about magic and witching, discovering she is a witch despite coming from a non-witching family. With the help of her new friend Maud Spellbody, Mildred goes to an academy for witches and is admitted after she saves it from the headmistress Miss Cackle's evil sister Agatha whose magic is later taken away. Mildred struggles with tasks and work, not knowing about witching her whole life, unlike her classmates. She forms friendships with new girl Enid Nightshade but becomes Ethel Hallow's rival. Later, Mildred gets expelled for leaving the grounds without permission. Agatha comes to Cackle's, tricks Esmeralda, Ethel's older sister, into giving Agatha her magic and takes over as headmistress. Learning Agatha has become headmistress from her rival, Mildred returns to Cackle's, hoping to save it. After Agatha annihilates the school due to no one liking her, Mildred and her classmates perform a spell which reverses all of Agatha's spell. Mildred is brought back to Cackle's and finishes her first year.

Series 2
Mildred returns to Cackle's, a much better witch than she was before. The founding stone, a stone given to witching academies to fuel magic is found. Ethel receives a visit from Esmeralda, trying to convince Esmeralda to take the founding stone's magic which she refuses. However, to save Sybil, Ethel and Esmeralda's younger sister, Esmeralda is forced to take the founding stone's magic, causing magic to go wrong and the castle to start freezing. While Mildred, Maud, Enid and the Hallow sisters search for a way to re-ignite the founding stone, Mildred stumbles upon her ancestor on her family tree and learns the Hubbles are a witching family but Mirabelle, her ancestor, sacrificed her and twelve generations of magic to re-ignite the founding stone. After everybody starts freezing and the academy is evacuated, Mildred realises if she wants to save the academy, she must do what Mirabelle did. Mildred starts the spell but half-way through, Miss Mould, the art teacher, takes her place and sacrifices her magic.

Series 3
Miss Cackle invites Mildred's mum Julie to teach art at Cackle's; however, Julie is treated horribly by Miss Hardbroom, the potions teacher, causing Mildred to steal a wishing star and make her mum magical. At first, Julie is horrified but she eventually starts to like it. However, things get suspicious and Julie gives up her magic. Later, Mildred learns Julie still has her magic and has become malevolent, turning people into clay figures. Miss Hardbroom tells Mildred she made her friend Indigo Moon magical but Indigo also became malevolent and turned to stone for thirty years. Mildred makes a potion to prevent her mum turning to stone and, in the process, turns those who turned into clay figures and Indigo Moon back to people. Julie leaves Cackle's but Indigo crashes into Mildred's room. To stay at Cackle's, Indigo needs to pass her Witch Proficiency Exam which she does but them learns Miss Hardbroom is her old friend and leaves Cackle's. Ethel, however, steals a wishing star and wishes to save the school but results in the school being damaged by a fake Indigo Moon. To stop the fake Indigo, Miss Hardbroom apologises to the real Indigo and they return to Cackle's, proving the fake Indigo is not real.

Series 4
Ethel casts an appearance spell on Mildred to prevent her from running for head girl but Mildred runs and is given a series of tasks to beat Ethel. Mildred withdraws from the competition but finds water that can tell the future and sees Ethel as head girl in front of empty chairs. Horrified, Mildred re-enters the head girl contest in attempt to save the school. During the spell challenge, Ethel's deputy Felicity Foxglove makes Mildred's potion backfire, causing Miss Cackle to turn to glass and Mildred to be sent to Wormwood Academy for Undesirable Witches. Ethel frees Agatha from a photograph Miss Cackle trapped her in and Maud learns Mildred was framed. To save Mildred, Maud gets herself sent to Wormwood and helps her escape. However, Mildred's vision comes true and all the students are sent into vanishment after Agatha changes the Witches' Promise. To take the students out of vanishment, the name of Agatha's first familiar must be said. Spell science teacher Mr Daisy makes a potion which turns Miss Cackle back to herself who says the name, taking everyone out of vanishment. After learning she must return to the photograph, Agatha sends herself into vanishment. In recognition of saving the academy once more, Mildred is promoted to Head Girl and Maud is promoted to Deputy Head Girl in a promotion ceremony on the last day of term and Ethel reconciles with Sybil and Felicity. The series ends with Ethel reconciling with Mildred after apologizing to her for causing trouble and becomes Mildred's adviser.

Main cast

Episodes

Production

Development and casting
In 2014, a new series of The Worst Witch was in development with the BBC. Jill Murphy, the author of the book series, said the series should be "wonderful". The cast of the show was announced in October 2016. Bella Ramsey, who had starred in Game of Thrones, was cast as Mildred. Ramsey drew similarities between herself and Mildred. Meibh Campbell played the role of Maud Spellbody for series 1, but was replaced by Megan Hughes from series 2. Of her casting, Hughes said working on the show is "great and I [Hughes] love the experience" and that she is "so grateful for the opportunity". Hughes had two auditions before being offered the part of Maud. Tamara Smart gained the part of Enid Nightshade after four months of auditioning, which she described as "very long" yet "nerve racking but at the same time very exciting". Smart was excited about the "amazing experience" when she got the part. Jenny Richardson and Miriam Petche were cast as sisters Ethel and Esmerelda Hallow. Tallulah Milligan, the daughter of Coronation Street and Waterloo Road actress Angela Griffin, was cast as Drusilla Paddock. Griffin said Milligan "absolutely loved" working on the show. Dagny Rollins plays the role of Felicity Foxglove.

Filming
The Worst Witch was filmed at Peckforton Castle, Peckforton Cheshire, England and Burg Hohenzollern, Swabian Alps, Germany. The second series is also filmed at Adlington Hall, Adlington, Cheshire, using their grand hall, minstrel's gallery and their countryside and woods backdrop. Bella Ramsey described filming as being "really good", but said there were some challenging elements and described learning the stunts as "hard". Megan Hughes' mother, Claire, stated that Hughes had an "amazing time" and was "really happy, really positive" throughout filming.

Reception

Critical response
On Rotten Tomatoes, the first series has a rating of 100% based on five critic reviews, with an average rating of 8/10. Decider called the show "sweet, fun, and a little bit goofy". Common Sense Media favourably compared it to Harry Potter though it was "quirkier" and "less scary".

Accolades

See also
 Hilda (TV series) - Another Netflix show starring Bella Ramsey and is joined by Ameerah Falzon-Ojo from another CBBC show, So Awkward.

Notes

References

External links
 
 
 

The Worst Witch
2010s British children's television series
2010s German television series
2017 British television series debuts
2017 German television series debuts
2020s British children's television series
2020s German drama television series
2020 British television series endings
2020 German television series endings
BBC children's television shows
British supernatural television shows
British television shows based on children's books
English-language Netflix original programming
Netflix children's programming
Television series about teenagers
Television about magic
Television shows filmed in England
Television shows filmed in Germany
Witchcraft in television
Wizards in television
ZDF original programming